The  is an electric multiple unit (EMU) train type operated by Kintetsu Railway in Japan.

Formation
The trains are formed as six-car sets.

History
Six four-car sets were built between 1986 and 1987. The sets were lengthened in 1987 and 1988, and another six-car set was built in 1988.

References

External links

 Kintetsu official website 

Electric multiple units of Japan
3200 series

Kinki Sharyo multiple units
1500 V DC multiple units of Japan